Eremias szczerbaki (commonly known as Szczerbak's racerunner) is a species of lizard endemic to Kyrgyzstan.

References

Eremias
Reptiles described in 1992
Endemic fauna of Kyrgyzstan
Reptiles of Central Asia
Taxa named by Valery Konstantinovich Jeremčenko
Taxa named by Alexander M. Panfilov
Taxa named by E.I. Zarinenko